The  was a cadet branch of the Fujiwara clan founded by Fujiwara no Umakai, i.e., one of the four great houses of the Fujiwara, founded by the so-called , who were sons of Fujiwara no Fuhito.

Thus Shikike may be translated the "Ceremonials House."

The other branches were the Nanke (the eldest brother Muchimaro's line), Hokke (Fusasaki's line), and the Kyōke (Fujiwara no Maro's line).

Umakai's son  mounted a rebellion named after his name in 740, which ended with suppression and his death, spelling ill-fortune for the Shikike. The Nanke then gained hegemony again (back from the non-Fujiwara Tachibana no Moroe) until Nakamaro mounted his own uprising.

Shikike came into ascendancy with Fujiwara no Momokawa. The notorious  who enticed and held sway over Emperor Heizei is also of the Shikike clan.

See also
 Hokke (Fujiwara)
 Nanke (Fujiwara)
 Kyōke

Notes

References
 Brinkley, Frank and Dairoku Kikuchi. (1915). A History of the Japanese People from the Earliest Times to the End of the Meiji Era. New York: Encyclopædia Britannica. OCLC 413099
 Nussbaum, Louis-Frédéric and Käthe Roth. (2005). Japan Encyclopedia. Cambridge: Harvard University Press. ;  OCLC 58053128

Fujiwara clan
Japanese clans